In quantum mechanics, resonance cross section occurs in the context of quantum scattering theory, which deals with studying the scattering of quantum particles from potentials. The scattering problem deals with the calculation of flux distribution of scattered particles/waves as a function of the potential, and of the state (characterized by conservation of momentum/energy) of the incident particle. For a free quantum particle incident on the potential, the plane wave solution to the time-independent Schrödinger wave equation is:

For one-dimensional problems, the transmission coefficient  is of interest. It is defined as:

where  is the probability current density. This gives the fraction of incident beam of particles that makes it through the potential. For three-dimensional problems, one would calculate the scattering cross-section , which, roughly speaking, is the total area of the incident beam which is scattered. Another quantity of relevance is the partial cross-section, which denotes the scattering cross section for a partial wave of a definite angular momentum eigenstate.

The values of these quantities of interest, the transmission coefficient  (in case of one dimensional potentials), and the partial cross-section  show peaks in their variation with the incident energy . These phenomena are called resonances.

One-dimensional case

Mathematical description
A one-dimensional finite square potential is given by

The sign of  determines whether the square potential is a well or a barrier. To study the phenomena of resonance, the time-independent Schrödinger equation for a stationary state of a massive particle with energy  is solved:

The wave function solutions for the three regions  are

It follows that the transmission coefficient  reaches its maximum value of 1 when:

for any integer value .

Physical picture (Standing de Broglie Waves and the Fabry-Pérot Etalon) 
From the above expression, resonance occurs when the distance covered by the particle in traversing the well and back is an integral multiple of the De Broglie wavelength of a particle inside the potential. For , reflections at potential discontinuities are not accompanied by any phase change. Therefore, resonances correspond to the formation of standing waves within the potential barrier/well. Far from resonances, standing waves can't be formed. The physics is similar to that of transmission in Fabry–Pérot interferometer in optics, where the resonance condition and functional form of the transmission coefficient are the same.

Nature of resonance curves 
This is demonstrated in plots of transmission coefficient against incident particle energy for fixed values of the shape factor, defined as

References 

Quantum mechanics